Sri Lanka competed at the 1992 Summer Olympics in Barcelona, Spain.

Competitors
The following is the list of number of competitors in the Games.

Athletics

 Vijitha Amerasekera
 Damayanthi Dharsha
Sriyantha Dissanayake 
Men's 100m metres
 Heat — 10.87 (→ did not advance)
 Jayamini Illeperuma
 Kuruppu Karunaratne
Men's Marathon — 2:32.26 (→ 71st place)
 Sriyani Kulawansa 
Women's High Jump
 Qualification — did not start (→ did not advance)
Sriyani Dhammika Menike
Women's 800 metres
 Heat — 2:03.85 (→ did not advance)

Badminton

 Niroshan Wijekoon

Shooting

 Pushpamali Ramanayake
 Lucky Rajasinghe
 Daya Rajasinghe

Swimming

 Julian Bolling
Men's 200m Freestyle
 Heat – 2:02.01 (→ did not advance, 49th place)

Men's 100m Butterfly
 Heat – 1:01.63 (→ did not advance, 65th place)

Men's 200m Butterfly
 Heat – 2:17.47 (→ did not advance, 44th place)

Weightlifting

 Ansela Marlen Wijewickrema

References

Official Olympic Reports
Sri Lanka at the 1992 Barcelona Summer Games

Nations at the 1992 Summer Olympics
1992
1992 in Sri Lankan sport